Piers 3 and 5 North known as the Girard Group on Philadelphia's Delaware River waterfront were built by the City of Philadelphia and named in honor of Stephen Girard who built wharfs in this area in the early nineteenth century. The Benjamin Franklin Bridge is one block north of the northern pier.

References

Buildings and structures on the National Register of Historic Places in Pennsylvania
Buildings and structures completed in 1923
Buildings and structures in Philadelphia
Penn's Landing
National Register of Historic Places in Philadelphia